Fongoro may refer to:

Fongoro people, an ethnic group of Sudan and Chad
Fongoro language, a minor Central Sudanic language of Chad and formerly of Sudan

See also
Georges Fonghoro (1958–2016), Malian Roman Catholic prelate, bishop of Mopti